= Emperor Wilhelm =

Emperor Wilhelm may refer to:

- Wilhelm I (1797–1888), German Emperor and King of Prussia
- Wilhelm II (1859–1941), German Emperor and King of Prussia
